Gymnopilus farinaceus is a species of mushroom in the family Hymenogastraceae.

See also

List of Gymnopilus species

External links
Gymnopilus farinaceus at Index Fungorum

farinaceus
Taxa named by William Alphonso Murrill